Hozelock Ltd was originally set up by Sydney Codling in 1959 to sell hoses and garden equipment including the first plastic quick-connector hose connector.  As well as manufacturing the equipment in the Haddenham factory they also designed many of their own products.

Sydney's son, David Codling, took over as Chief Executive circa 1990, after the business was bought in 1990 by CVC Capital Partners, then named Citicorp Venture Capital, in a £24m buy-out from Ropner, the conglomerate.

CVC bought the business with rival private equity groups Cinven, Legal & General Ventures and Prudential's venture capital division. Hozelock was floated in 1993, but CVC took the company private again in 1999 for £85m after a succession of wet summers and stock market turmoil halved the company's share price.

In 2009 the brand agency Haines McGregor was engaged to help develop the European positioning for the brand. Following two previously unsuccessful attempts to sell the business in 2007-9 for £100m, the new positioning and identity work helped support the successful sale to strategic buyer Exel Industries in October 2012 for £200m.

David Codling retired as Executive Chairman in 2009. Steve Hall then became Group CEO. The current  Ceo is Marc Ballu of Exel.

See also
 Gardena

References

Manufacturing companies of the United Kingdom
Retail companies established in 1959
Irrigation